Ricardo Clemente Quintela (born 16 March 1960) is an Argentine Justicialist Party politician who is currently Governor of La Rioja Province, since 11 December 2019. 

He was previously Mayor of the City of La Rioja from 2003 to 2015, as well as a member of the provincial legislature during two non-consecutive terms and a National Deputy from 1997 to 2003.

Since 2020, Quintela has been the president of the La Rioja chapter of the Justicialist Party.

Political career
Quintela's political activism began early in his life in the Peronist Youth; he was appointed president of the La Rioja Capital Department Peronist Youth in 1986. In 1993 he was elected to the Legislature of La Rioja for a four-year term, representing the Capital Department. Following the end of this term, he was elected to the Argentine Chamber of Deputies for La Rioja, serving a full four-year term until 2003.

From 2003 to 2015 he was intendente (mayor) of the City of La Rioja. In 2017 he was elected again to the Provincial Chamber of Deputies, representing the Capital Department as well.

In 2019, then-governor Sergio Casas attempted to hold a referendum to modify the provincial constitution and allow further re-elections; the attempt was blocked by the Supreme Court of Argentina, and so Casas nominated Quintela, a close ally, to succeed him in the post. Quintela ran in the 2019 election in a three-way race against a fellow Justicialist Party candidate and former governor, Luis Beder Herrera, as well as Juntos por el Cambio candidate Julio Martínez; Quintela won with 45% of the vote and was sworn in on 11 December 2019.

On 13 October 2020, Quintela was elected as president of the La Rioja provincial chapter of the Justicialist Party, following the resignation of Casas from the post.

Personal life
Quintela is nicknamed "El Gitano". He has five children: Emilse, Christian, Exequiel, Jerónimo and Guadalupe. His sister, Teresa Quintela, is also active in politics and served as a national senator for La Rioja.

References

External links

Official website of the Governorship of La Rioja (in Spanish)

1960 births
Living people
People from La Rioja Province, Argentina
Members of the Argentine Chamber of Deputies elected in La Rioja
Members of the Legislature of La Rioja
Mayors of La Rioja, Argentina
Governors of La Rioja Province, Argentina
Justicialist Party politicians
21st-century Argentine politicians